William Herle (died 1589) was an Englishman who led a double life as a respectable Member of Parliament and county sheriff, and well as a privateer and spy who was imprisoned in the Marshalsea prison in 1571. He became known for his part in Elizabeth I's intelligence network inside the jail, smuggling letters to William Cecil, Lord Burghley, about people involved in the so-called Ridolfi plot, a Roman Catholic plan to assassinate the Queen and replace her with Mary, Queen of Scots.

Privateering 
William Herle has been alleged to be in the services of Sir William Garrard in the 1565's as Garrard lord mayor of London had a market in the northern sea. This brought Herle to the attention to William Cecil who hired him in the mid-1560s to travel among the allies to England to supply them. Herle was sent to raid ships among the Themes as he took ships to form forging traders even causing Margaret, Duchess of Parma, a Spanish regent in the Netherlands call to Elizabeth I to stop the private. In July of the year 1566, William Herle handed himself to William Cecil to be imprisoned and to be questioned for his pirating; this was one of many imprisonments he would face. For the trial of the July 1566, he was acquitted as he was not on the ship Tigger which was the one that was raiding the other ship. This is how many a time Herle would escape as he would be not on the ship that the pirating was on.

Imprisonment
William Herle would be placed in prison a few time in his lifetime due to his crimes as a pirate. He was imprisoned in Marshalsea for many times. He would have been given the normal sentence of a pirate which was death to pirates but he often manages to escape by a loophole which he stayed in the jail, and he wrote of his experiences. William Herle wrote in his journal as well to William Cecil about the time he was in jail and the other prisoners because of his writing we have a better understanding of Tudor jail life. One of these times was in 1571 where he wrote to William Cecil several times about the Ridolfi Plot. He wrote to William Cecil of Mary of Scotlands guest and what he could tell what they spoke off. He even manages to get letters to William Cecil proving the plot against Elizabeth I.

References

Sources
 Adams, Robyn. "'The Service I am Here for': William Herle in the Marshalsea Prison, 1571," Huntington Library Quarterly, June 2009, Vol. 72, No. 2, pp. 217–238.
 Adams, R. “'All at Sea': An Accusation of Piracy against William Herle in 1565". Topic : The Washington and Jefferson College Review, 2012. http://discovery.ucl.ac.uk/1367031/1/Adams.pdf.
 Adams, Robyn. "A Spy on the Payroll? William Herle and the Mid Elizabethan Polity". Historical Research 83, no. 220 (2010): 266–280. https://doi.org/10.1111/j.1468-2281.2009.00517.x.
 Bossy, John. "[23 November/3 December 1583: William Herle to Lord Burghley, London]". In Giordano Bruno and the Embassy Affair, 206–8. Yale University Press, 1991. https://www.jstor.org/stable/j.ctt1dszzpr.23.

Year of birth missing
1588 deaths
English pirates
16th-century English people
English spies
16th-century spies
Inmates of the Marshalsea